Elections to Tonbridge and Malling Borough Council were held on 6 May 1999. The whole borough council (55 members) were up for election. Parish council elections were held on the same day.

Overall results
The council stayed under no overall control. Tonbridge and Malling had been a top target for the Conservatives but they fell one seat short of gaining overall control.

References

1999 English local elections
Tonbridge and Malling Borough Council elections
1990s in Kent